Billboard Top R&B Records of 1961 is the year-end chart compiled by Billboard magazine ranking the top rhythm and blues singles of 1961.

See also
List of Hot R&B Sides number ones of 1961
Billboard Year-End Hot 100 singles of 1961
1961 in music

References

United States RandB year-end
Billboard charts
1961 in American music